The 1891 Cincinnati Reds season was a season in American baseball. Shortly before the start of the baseball season, owner Al Johnson sold the club to John T. Brush. The team finished in a tie for last place in the National League with the Pittsburgh Pirates with a record of 56–81, 30.5 games behind the Boston Beaneaters.

Regular season 
After a fairly successful first season in the National League in 1890, the Reds looked to improve on their 77–55 record in 1891. The team brought back manager Tom Loftus for a second season.

Cincinnati had a new starting shortstop, as Germany Smith joined the team from the Brooklyn Bridegrooms.  The light hitting Smith batted .191 with a homer and 47 RBI with the Bridegrooms in 1890.  The Reds would also have third baseman Arlie Latham for the full season, as he had split the 1890 season between the Reds and Chicago Pirates of the Players' League.  Latham had some big seasons with the St. Louis Browns of the American Association in the 1880s, leading the league in runs (152) in 1886, and stolen bases (109) in 1888.  Veteran pitcher Old Hoss Radbourn joined the Reds after going 27–12 with a 3.31 with the Boston Reds of the Players' League in 1890.  Radbourn had a huge season back in 1884 with the Providence Grays, going 59–12 with a 1.38 ERA, 73 complete games and striking out 441 hitters.

Bug Holliday rebounded from a substandard 1890 season by leading the team with a .319 average, nine homers and 84 RBI.  Jocko Halligan, who joined the Reds in July, had a .312 average with three homers and 44 RBI in only 61 games.  Latham hit .272 with seven homers and 53 RBI, as well as leading the team with 87 stolen bases. Tony Mullane led the pitching staff with 23 victories, while Billy Rhines finished the year 17–24 with a team best 2.87 ERA and 138 strikeouts.

Season summary 
The Reds started the season off losing four games in a row to their Ohio rivals, the Cleveland Spiders, which included a 23–4 loss. That set the tone for the season, as wins were scarce, as Cincinnati fell into the National League cellar. The Reds battled back, finishing off the season with a seven-game winning streak to move into a virtual tie with the Pittsburgh Pirates for seventh place. Both teams finished 30½ games behind the pennant winning Boston Beaneaters, but the Reds had a slightly better winning percentage by virtue of having played two more games than the Pirates.

Season standings

Record vs. opponents

Roster

Player stats

Batting

Starters by position 
Note: Pos = Position; G = Games played; AB = At bats; H = Hits; Avg. = Batting average; HR = Home runs; RBI = Runs batted in

Other batters 
Note: G = Games played; AB = At bats; H = Hits; Avg. = Batting average; HR = Home runs; RBI = Runs batted in

Pitching

Starting pitchers 
Note: G = Games pitched; IP = Innings pitched; W = Wins; L = Losses; ERA = Earned run average; SO = Strikeouts

References

External links
1891 Cincinnati Reds season at Baseball Reference

Cincinnati Reds seasons
Cincinnati Reds season
Cincinnati Reds